Julio Muller Luján (28 February 1905 – 28 March 1984) was a Mexican polo player who competed in the 1936 Summer Olympics. Born in Chihuahua, Chihuahua, he was the captain of the Mexican polo team, which won the bronze medal. He played all three matches in the tournament.

External links

Julio Mueller's profile at databaseOlympics
XI Juegos Olimpicos Berlin 1936 - Bronce | Equipo de Polo 
Julio Mueller's profile at Sports Reference.com

1905 births
1984 deaths
Mexican people of German descent
Mexican polo players
Olympic bronze medalists for Mexico
Olympic polo players of Mexico
Sportspeople from Chihuahua (state)
Polo players at the 1936 Summer Olympics
Olympic medalists in polo
Medalists at the 1936 Summer Olympics
People from Chihuahua City